The canton of Chevigny-Saint-Sauveur is an administrative division of the Côte-d'Or department, eastern France. It was created at the French canton reorganisation which came into effect in March 2015. Its seat is in Chevigny-Saint-Sauveur.

It consists of the following communes:
Bressey-sur-Tille
Chevigny-Saint-Sauveur
Magny-sur-Tille
Neuilly-Crimolois
Quetigny
Sennecey-lès-Dijon

References

Cantons of Côte-d'Or